Plura may refer to:

 Plura (river), in Rana, Nordland county, Norway
 Plura Jonsson (born 1951), Swedish musician and author known by the mononym Plura
 Carlo Giuseppe Plura (1663–1737), Swiss-Italian stucco artist 
 Joseph Plura the Elder (died 1756), Italian sculptor
 Joseph Plura the Younger (c. 1777–1786), English sculptor of Italian descent
 Marek Plura (1970–2023), Polish politician

See also
 Pleura
Plural